Thomas or Tom Riley may refer to:

Thomas Riley (Pennsylvania politician), former chairman of the Pennsylvania Convention Center Authority Board
Thomas J. Riley (1885–1928), American football player, coach and attorney
Thomas Joseph Riley (1900–1976), American prelate of the Roman Catholic Church
Thomas T. Riley (born 1949), U.S. Ambassador to Morocco
Thomas W. Riley (died 1872), U.S. politician
Thomas F. Riley (1912–1998), United States Marine Corps general
Thomas S. Riley (1852–1938), attorney general of West Virginia
Thomas Riley (Medal of Honor), United States Army soldier and recipient of the Medal of Honor
Tom Riley (actor) (born 1981), English actor
Tom Riley (footballer) (1882–1942), English footballer
Tom Riley (Iowa politician) (1929–2011), lawyer and member of both houses of the Iowa legislature
Tom Riley (rugby union) (born 1985), Welsh rugby union player
Tom Riley (soccer), Canadian soccer player
Tom Riley (tattoo artist) (19th century), early British tattoo artist

See also
Thomas Reilly (disambiguation)